Menksoft (Mongolian:  Müngke Gal soft, lit. "inextinguishible flame"; Chinese: , Pinyin: Měng Kē Lì, lit. "Mongol·Technology·Self-support") is an IT company in Inner Mongolia, who developed Menksoft Mongolian IME, the most widely used Mongolian language input method editor (IME) in Inner Mongolia.

History
Menksoft was established in May 2002 by S. Soyolt (Pinyin: Sū. Sūyǎlātú). In 2003, it was evaluated as a major software enterprise of Inner Mongolia and one of the 20 largest private enterprises in Hohhot. In 2004, it gained the Gold Prize of INT'L Soft China. It is supported by the Chinese government.

Corporate leadership
Menksoft holds close ties with the Inner Mongolia University for Nationalities. The Mongolian website of Inner Mongolia University for Nationalities is tl.menksoft.com under the Menksoft webhost menksoft.com.

Input method series and their code

The Mongolian code used in Menksoft Mongolian IMEs has become the de facto international code of Mongolian: the largest competitor of Menksoft in Mongolian script input domain — Saiyin — wrote a "howto" for users to use Saiyin code and Menksoft code in parallel, and says "What would you do if you've already installed and registered Saiyin IME, but you want to contribute for newspaper office? They do only accept Menksoft code. Saiyin has already settled this problem for you" on a page of its website called " How to use Saiyin IME with Menksoft in parallel."

Besides the integrated code converter in Menksoft Mongolian IME, there is a standalone version converter which can convert almost every Mongolian script code, except Unicode.

Input method series
The Menksoft IMEs are a collection of Input method editors (IMEs) for typing Mongolian-related scripts such as  Mongolian script, Uyghurjin script, Manchu script, and Xibe script.

Menksoft Mongolian Input method series

Menksoft Mongolian IME is the only free and widely used input method editor of Menksoft.

Supported scripts include Mongolian, Uyghurjin, Manchu, Xibe, etc.

The Menksoft IMEs make use of Private Use Areas (PUA) of Unicode and the Chinese GB 18030 code that form the so-called "Menksoft Mongolian code".

With the influence of Chinese input methods built-in whole sentence input pattern, the focus of Menksoft Mongolian IME is not placed on a Mongolian keyboard layout, but on phoneme pattern input methods, as they are more commonly used for Chinese language text.

For the  standard Unicode keyboard layout of Menksoft, see Menksoft Mongolian Phoneme Input Methods.
For the word pattern IME of Menksoft, see Menk Mongolian Whole-Word Input method

Unicode was late to provide adequate support for the Mongolian script, where the first and as of 2009 only functional implementation is shipped with Windows Vista. This resulted in some popularity for the Menksoft IMEs in Inner Mongolia, where even the local government websites uses them.

There is an English interface of Menksoft Mongolian IME, but Menksoft did not build an English installation program. People using operating systems without Chinese language support must use the Chinese installation programs (maybe mojibake) and set the language settings to English interface through the language bar after installation. Menksoft is incompatible with Macintosh operating systems.

Menk Mongolian Whole-Word Input method

In this method, you can type fewer letters than Menksoft Mongolian IME. For example, "sainjiyaga" in Menksoft Mongolian IME becomes "saijyg"; "erdemtu" becomes "eedt"; the word "Mongol" can be input by typing "mc;gv".

Unlike Menksoft Mongolian IME, the whole-word input method is not freeware; it is a professional and educational edition.

Supported scripts are Mongolian, clear, Manchu, and Xibe.

Menksoft Mongolian Phoneme Input Methods

Menksoft Mongolian Phoneme Input Methods are keyboard layouts using ISO/IEC 10646-1:2000(E) standard Unicode (except for Uyghur style Mongolian script).

Supported scripts are Mongolian, Uyghur-style Mongolian (Proto-Mongolian, Mongolian written in Old Uyghur alphabet by Tatar-Tonga), Clear, Manchu, Xibe, and Mongolian Cyrillic Mongolian script.

Menksoft Khitan small script application system

Menksoft Kazak IME

Menksoft International Phonetic Input method
A related keyboard.

Network

Menksoft Content Management System
MenkCMS
Mongolian CMS System Technique Study
Menksoft Web Develop Department

Fonts
Embedded fonts of Menksoft Mongolian IME
 Menksoft Garqag
 Menksoft Hara
 Menksoft Hawang
 Menksoft Qagan
 Menksoft Scnin
 Menksoft (Menksoft.tte) default EUDC font ("end-user-defined character"), the only font support not only Hudum Mongolian, but also Todo, Manchu, Sibe, Uyghurjin, Phags-pa, Soyombo, Horizontal Square, etc. Not selectable in font list.

Menksoft Qagan is the standard font and looks similar to Menksoft.tte and Mongolian Baiti. Qagan (a.k.a. Chagan) means white in Mongolian.

Standalone
 Menksoft Qimed
 Mengsoft Amglang

Word processing
Mongolian WPS Office 2002
Cooperate with Kingsoft. Adopted by Inner Mongolia Academy of Social Science, but the interface is poor.

Menksoft Ethnical RedFlag Linux
There is a Menksoft Ethnical RedFlag Linux. There is also an Office system work in Chinese Linux (not the former Linux).

See also
 Boljoo

References

External links
 Menksoft 
 English Introduction 
 A guide for installation for Menksoft Mongolian IME 2008 
 A website run by Menksoft  and 
 Mongolian WPS Office 2002 Professional Edition (193MB), Unofficial Tiny Edition (45.5MB)
 Possibly Menk Mongolian Whole-Word IME, Guide PDF (in traditional Mongolian)
  Menksoft Mongolian IME
  Menksoft Mongolian IME (The English advertisement is the download link)
  Mongolian site by Menksoft

Software companies of China
Companies based in Hohhot
Companies established in 2002